The  is a conservative and right-wing populist political party in Japan. Formed as Initiatives from Osaka in October 2015 from a split in the old Japan Innovation Party, the party became the third-biggest opposition party in the National Diet following the July 2016 House of Councillors election.

The party advocates decentralization, federalism (Dōshūsei), free education, limited government, and neoliberal policies. Arguing to remove defense spending limits, and standing with the Liberal Democratic Party on revising the constitution, the party gained conservative support during the 2021 general election, primarily in Osaka.

History
The party was formed in October 2015 under the name  by Osaka governor Ichirō Matsui and then-Osaka mayor Tōru Hashimoto after they and their supporters left the Japan Innovation Party. The Japanese name was the same as the Osaka Restoration Association, which was also formed by Hashimoto, but was differentiated by writing "Osaka" in hiragana rather than in kanji.

The first major election contested by the party was the July 2016 House of Councillors election. The party performed well in the Kansai region, winning two of four seats in the Osaka at-large district and one of three seats in the Hyogo at-large district. In the national PR block the party finished fifth with 5,153,584 votes (9.2%), which meant it won 4 of the 48 seats. The majority of its votes were again centred around Osaka; the party received the most votes in Osaka Prefecture (1,293,626; 34.9%) and was second behind the Liberal Democratic Party in Hyogo Prefecture (470,526; 19.5%). The gain in seats made the party the third-biggest opposition in the National Diet. However, after the election Matsui said the poor showing outside of Kansai was unacceptable for a national party, and that the party would adopt a new name that did not include the word "Osaka" in an attempt to broaden its nationwide appeal. At a meeting on 23 August 2016, the party voted to change its name to  but did not announce an official English name.

Ideology, platform and policy 
Views on the political position of Nippon Ishin no Kai have been varied. While it has been described as being neoliberal, conservative, right-wing populist, the party itself commits to reformism, regionalism and 'self-sustainability' in its party constitution. The party supports the amendment of the Japanese constitution, including the installation of a constitutional court, mandated free education, and increased devolution. The party has not made an official stance on neither supporting or opposing the amendment to Article 9 of the Japanese constitution, which prohibits Japan from possessing an offensive military, however has pledged to partake in debate. Economically, the party supports increased economic liberalisation, including deregulation of the labour market and the streamlining of bureaucratic structure. Socially, the party supports the legalisation of same-sex marriage, and optional separate surnames for married couples. The party has recently been described as centrist and moderate, being perceived as such by the voter base, according to recent public opinion polls. The party was also referred to as libertarian.

The party manifesto for the 2022 Japanese Councillors election, dubbed "維新八策2022", containing 402 individual policy proposals, and included the following pledges :

 Reform of social insurance and pension system, with the introduction of a universal basic income of ¥60,000 per month, with additional supplements for non-coupled elderly
 Reform of income tax and social insurance fees, replacing the current system with a two-tiered income tax
 Deregulation of the workforce, allowing for compensated dismissals
 Reform of the social medical insurance system from age-based subsidy rates to income-based cost subsidies
 Universal access to free education from preschool to university, written within the constitution
 Free access to childbirth services through a voucher system.
 Introduction of the "2:1 rule", requiring two pieces of regulation to be removed per introduction of any new industrial regulation
 Deregulation of protected industries such as ridesharing, finance and agriculture
 Separate surnames for married couples
 Same-sex marriage legalisation
 Maintaining current emission reduction targets with consideration of carbon pricing schemes
 Legislating Osaka as the vice-capital of Japan
 Push for further devolution with merger of prefectures into states (dōshūsei), while allocating the consumption tax as a regional tax
 Constitutional amendments including: Universal free education, devolution, and the establishment of constitutional courts
 Maintaining agnate succession of the Imperial throne while considering re-royalisation of former Imperial household members.
 Repealing the 1%GDP cap on defence spending, aiming for 2% spending and the establishment of a national intelligence organisation.
 Promotion of free trade, especially within the Asia-pacific region.
 Adding hospital capacity for COVID-19 treatment through controls over privately-run hospitals.
 Temporary cuts to reduction rate on consumption tax rate from 8% down to 3%.
 30% reduction in diet members, and a 30% cut in member's compensation.
 Contributions reform prohibiting corporate and organisational donations to political parties and candidates.
 Establishment of a public documents bureau, digitalisation of all public document, and maintaining edit records through utilisation of blockchain technology.
 Introduction of Anti-Hate Speech legislation.

Leadership

Parliamentary caucus leadership 
(Source:)

Party Leaders

Election results

House of Representatives

House of Councillors

See also 
 Nippon Kaigi

Notes

References

External links 
 Nippon Ishin no Kai 

Politics of Japan
Conservatism in Japan
Conservative parties in Asia
Political parties established in 2015
2015 establishments in Japan
Neoliberal parties
Centre-right parties in Asia
Politics of Osaka Prefecture
Nationalist parties in Japan
Conservative parties in Japan
Federalist parties
Historical revisionism of Comfort women
Libertarian conservative parties
Libertarian parties in Japan
Right-libertarianism
Right-wing parties in Asia
Right-wing populism in Japan
Right-wing populist parties